Arthur Edward Sinning (1902–1985) was an English professional footballer of the 1920s. Born in Tottenham, he joined Gillingham from Tottenham Hotspur in 1923 and went on to make 12 appearances for the club in The Football League, scoring two goals.

References

External links
Rootsweb profile

1902 births
1985 deaths
English footballers
Footballers from Tottenham
Gillingham F.C. players
Tottenham Hotspur F.C. players
Association footballers not categorized by position